Navarro is a partido in the northeast of Buenos Aires Province in Argentina.

Settlements
José J. Almeyra
Las Marianas
Navarro
Villa Moll

References

External links

 

1881 establishments in Argentina
Partidos of Buenos Aires Province